Corinna Boccacini (born 10 March 1985) is an Italian snowboarder. She competed in the slalom events at the 2014 Winter Olympics for Italy.

References

Italian female snowboarders
Living people
Olympic snowboarders of Italy
Snowboarders at the 2006 Winter Olympics
Snowboarders at the 2010 Winter Olympics
Snowboarders at the 2014 Winter Olympics
1985 births
Universiade medalists in snowboarding
Universiade bronze medalists for Italy
Competitors at the 2005 Winter Universiade
Competitors at the 2007 Winter Universiade
Snowboarders of Centro Sportivo Carabinieri
21st-century Italian women